The Freedom Movement (GS) is a social liberal and green liberal political party. It was founded on 26 January 2022, as the successor of the Party of Green actions (Z.DEJ). At the January congress, Robert Golob was elected as the party's first president and the party received its new identity and name.

In its first parliamentary election, the party placed first, obtaining 41 of the 90 seats in the National Assembly, which is a record for a single party in the history of independent Slovenia. Chairman Robert Golob subsequently became Prime Minister of Slovenia heading the 15th Government in a coalition with the Social Democrats and The Left. Shortly after the elections, the Party of Alenka Bratušek and List of Marjan Šarec merged into the party.

History

Originally known as the Green Actions Party (Z.DEJ), its founding congress took place on 8 May 2021. It was founded by Jure Leben, and its establishment was announced in January of the same year on the Studio City show.

Jure Leben was elected the first chairman and Gregor Erbežnik became the vice-chairman. The leadership elected 119 delegates. In January 2022, the party was taken over by Robert Golob, who also changed the name to Freedom Movement.

In the 2022 parliamentary elections, the Freedom Movement placed first with 34.5% of the vote and won 41 of the 90 seats in the National Assembly, defeating the Slovenian Democratic Party and its three-term prime minister Janez Janša.  The Social Democrats, another centre-left party, announced that they would join a government led by Golob, in addition to The Left, giving him a majority in the legislature and making him Prime Minister of Slovenia, an office he assumed on 25 May 2022. In June 2022, the List of Marjan Šarec and Party of Alenka Bratušek voted in favor of merging into the party, which was approved by the Freedom Movement on 27 June. The official merger was scheduled for the first half of July.

After merger, the party got representatives in the European Parliament via former members of LMŠ, Irena Joveva and Klemen Grošelj.

Ideology and platform
The Freedom Movement is a social liberal, green liberal, progressive and Pro-European party with a centre-left orientation. The party seeks a balance between industrial progress and environmental preservation through environmental measures. As social measures, the party points out publicly available health care and the increase in the number of employees, the reform of the education system and the digitalisation of schools. According to former party chairman Leben, Slovenia should be able to rank among the 20 globally most competitive countries in the World Economic Forum criteria.

In his introductory speech, Jure Leben also mentioned the closure of "companies that blatantly pollute the environment" Kemis, Eternit, Termite, Ekosistem, the regulation of drinking water in Anhovo, the closure of the Velenje lignite mine (the only one in the country still operating), ban on hydraulic fracturing, the protection of forests and the declaration of an ecological crisis. The party would also introduce a tax on sweetened beverages and non-recycled plastics, while promoting sustainable forms of transport, decentralization and the decarbonisation of Slovenia.

In Croatia, the news portal Index commented that Robert Golob embodies the values of the late Prime Minister and President Janez Drnovšek.

Electoral results

National Assembly

Presidential

References

2021 establishments in Slovenia
Centre-left parties in Europe
Green liberalism
Green parties in Europe
Liberal parties in Slovenia
Political parties established in 2021